Pollyanna Grows Up is a 1915 children's novel by Eleanor H. Porter. It is the first of many sequels to Porter's best-selling Pollyanna (1913), but is the only one written by Porter herself; the numerous later additions to the Pollyanna franchise were the work of other authors.

Plot introduction
Pollyanna, now cured of her crippling spinal injury, spends her time teaching the "glad game" to a new town, and a very bitter woman, Mrs. Carew, who became very bitter hearted since her sister's son, Jamie, was missing. Along the way she makes new friends, such as Sadie and Jamie:  Jamie is a delicate literary genius whose withered legs compel him to rely on a wheelchair and crutches.

Nine years later, twenty-year-old Pollyanna and her aunt fall upon hard times. Following the death of Dr. Chilton, as a means of making money, Pollyanna and her aunt are forced to take in the friends Pollyanna made six years earlier as boarders. However, there are many skeletons lurking in people's closets, causing numerous misunderstandings and many revelations, including how her old childhood friend Jimmy Bean-Pendleton had ended up all alone since the death of his adoptive father.

Characters 
Pollyanna Whittier—relentlessly positive orphaned girl, born in a “faraway western town”, moved to rural Vermont at age eleven and gradually wins over her aunt Polly.
(Aunt) Polly Chilton—Pollyanna’s custodial maternal aunt who is gradually won over by her lively niece
(Dr.) Thomas Chilton—Polly Chilton’s husband
John Pendleton—Affluent Vermont bachelor, previously rejected as a suitor by Pollyanna’s late mother Jenifer
James "Jimmy Bean" Kent—orphaned son of John Kent and Doris (Wetherby) Kent, lived wth his father after this mother’s death, alone in an orphanage after his father’s death, and adopted by John Pendleton after fleeing the orphanage, known as Jimmy Bean before adoption by John Pendleton, known as Jimmy Pendleton after adoption by John Pendleton
“Jamie”—friend to Pollyanna in Boston, last name not known, referred to as “Sir James” by Jerry Murphy, originally confined to a wheelchair and cared for by “Mumsey” and Jerry Murphy, later adopted by Ruth Carew and able to walk with crutches, incorrectly suspected of actually being Jamie Kent
William Wetherby—father to Della Wetherby, Ruth (Wetherby) Carew,  and Doris (Wetherby) Kent
Della Wetherby—nurse working at the sanatorium, involved in Pollyanna’s care
Ruth (Wetherby) Carew—wealthy dowager, widowed after a year of marriage to an older unnamed husband, with whom she’d had a son who died within a year after her husband’s death
Doris (Wetherby) Kent—deceased sister of Ruth and Della
John Kent—deceased widower of Doris (Wetherby) Kent
Jerry Murphy—Boston newspaper hawker and friend to “Jamie”
“Mumsey”—surrogate mother to “Jamie”, suffers from rheumatoid arthritis
Sadie Dean—Boston salesgirl
“Sir Lancelot”, “Lady Rowena”, “Guinevere”—squirrels fed by “Jamie” and Pollyanna in Boston Public Garden
“The Professor”—deceased father to “Jamie”, actual name not known
Mary—maid who works for Ruth (Wetherby) Carew
Charlie Ames—colleague to Della Wetherby at the Boston sanatorium
Susie Smith—child from Honolulu, casual acquaintance to Pollyanna
Henry Dodge—property manager employed by Ruth Carew, makes her into an unknowing slumlord
Tommy Dolan, Jenny Dolan—neighbors to Jamie Kent, “Mumsey” and Jerry Murphy 
“Old” Tom Durgin, Timothy Durgin, Nancy Durgin, Mary Durgin—charged with the care of the Chilton household in Vermont during the family’s absence
Milly Snow—freelance typist in Vermont
Nellie Mahoney, Mrs. Tibbits—community members in Vermont
Mrs. Jones, Mrs. Peck—twin sisters and Ladies’ Aiders in a “faraway western town”

References

External links
 
 
 
Critical reception and bibliographic information for Pollyanna Grows Up, with a biographical sketch of Eleanor H. Porter.
 

1915 American novels
1915 children's books
American children's novels
Sequel novels
Novels set in Vermont